The Center for Brooklyn History (CBH, formerly known as the Brooklyn Historical Society) is a museum, library, and educational center founded in 1863 that preserves and encourages the study of Brooklyn's 400-year history. The center's Romanesque Revival building, located at Pierrepont and Clinton Streets in Brooklyn Heights, was designed by George B. Post and built in 1878-81, is a National Historic Landmark and part of New York City's Brooklyn Heights Historic District. The CBH houses materials relating to the history of Brooklyn and its people, and hosts exhibitions which draw over 9,000 members a year. In addition to general programming, the CBH serves over 70,000 public school students and teachers annually by providing exhibit tours, educational programs and curricula, and making its professional staff available for instruction and consultation.

History

The Center for Brooklyn History was founded in 1863 by Henry Pierrepont (1808–1888) as the Long Island Historical Society, with a charter from the New England Historical Society in Boston. In 1985, the society changed its name to the Brooklyn Historical Society (BHS).

In 2005, the BHS was among 406 New York City arts and social service institutions to receive part of a $20 million grant from the Carnegie Corporation, which was made possible through a donation by New York City mayor Michael Bloomberg.

In December 2007, BHS opened the first gallery in the United States devoted to oral history. The first exhibition installed in the gallery was an installation of oral histories, photographs, documents, and artifacts called "In Our Own Words: Portraits of Brooklyn's Vietnam Veterans".

In 2010 while cataloging the map collection, BHS staff discovered a previously uncatalogued, and rare copy of a c. 1770 map by Bernard Ratzer that has been restored and is now accessible to the public.

As part of the construction of Empire Stores at Brooklyn Bridge Park, BHS was selected to operate a  museum to celebrate Brooklyn's industrial history. The BHS Dumbo exhibition space, as it was called, opened in May 2017.

In 2020, the BHS made an agreement to merge with the Brooklyn Public Library. As of October 2020, the organization is now part of Brooklyn Public Library and is known as the Center for Brooklyn History.

Building
The center's headquarters building, on the corner of Pierrepoint and Clinton Streets, was built in 1878–81 and was designed by George B. Post in the Renaissance revival style. Post was selected as a result of a competition between 14 architects.  The building's design utilizes terra cotta ornamentation made by the Perth Amboy Terra Cotta Company, and has architectural sculptures by Olin Levi Warner, including busts of Michelangelo, Beethoven, Gutenberg, Shakespeare, Columbus, Benjamin Franklin, a Viking and a Native American.

The building has been described as "one of the City's great architectural treasures", and the interior as "one of New York's great 19th-century interiors."  It is part of the New York City Landmarks Preservation Commission's Brooklyn Heights Historic District, designated in 1966, and was added to the National Register of Historic Places as a National Historic Landmark in 1991. In October 1999, BHS began a full-scale restoration of the building, supervised by architect Jan Hird Pokorny, and reopened in 2003.

Programs

Principal activities of the CBH include education programs, which are organized around a central educational concept of encouraging students to understand that history is connected to their lives. CBH programs link the study of American history to events and sites in the students’ own communities by introducing the investigation of primary source documents and neighborhood histories. CBH's education programs largely focus on the ability of students to “read” primary source documents, including works of art, maps, photographs, and other artifacts.

Each year exhibitions are presented by the CBH, ranging from retrospectives and historical surveys to more focused presentations that explore specific themes and topics. Installations from the collection have included a gallery of family portraits and another of landscape paintings. These installations rotate over time, providing visitors with greater access to CBH's fine arts collections.

Collection

The Othmer Library has a collection that includes historic maps and atlases of Brooklyn and New York City, individual family histories in the genealogy collection, a microfilm collection of Brooklyn and Long Island newspapers from the 19th and early 20th century, a collection of microfiche pamphlets on slavery and abolition, the papers of abolitionist clergyman Henry Ward Beecher, the Pierrepont Papers, the Brooklyn Firefighting Collection, and the Brooklyn Council of Churches.

The Center for Brooklyn History possesses a collection of historical maps spanning the years ca. 1562–2011. The geographic coverage of the collection includes the five boroughs of New York City, Long Island, New York State, New Jersey, New England, the Mid-Atlantic, and the Eastern United States.

The Oral History Collections contain interviews with over 300 narrators. A 2013 Oral History Project is called Crossing Borders, Bridging Generations. It is a public programming series and oral history project about mixed-heritage families, with historical perspective.

See also
Brooklyn Visual Heritage
List of museums and cultural institutions in New York City
National Register of Historic Places listings in Kings County, New York

References
Notes

External links

Official website
The Landmark Building, at Brooklyn Historical Society
"Streetscapes/About Brooklyn Historical Society; An 1881 Landmark in Red Brick and Terra Cotta" by Christopher Gray, The New York Times, 2/11/2001

Organizations established in 1863
Museums established in 1863
Museums in Brooklyn
History of Brooklyn
Historical society museums in New York City
1863 establishments in New York (state)
Brooklyn Heights
Buildings and structures on the National Register of Historic Places in New York City
Buildings and structures in Brooklyn
National Historic Landmarks in New York City
Cultural infrastructure completed in 1881
Buildings and structures completed in 1881
History museums in New York City
National Register of Historic Places in Brooklyn
Historical societies in New York City
New York City Designated Landmarks in Brooklyn
New York City interior landmarks